Muara Satu is a district in Lhokseumawe, Aceh, Indonesia.

Administrative divisions 
list the name of the village (Gampong) is in Districts of Muara Satu

 Gampong BatuPhat Barat (postcode : 24352)
 Gampong BatuPhat Timur (postcode : 24352)
 Gampong Blang Naleung Mameh (postcode : 24352)
 Gampong Blang Panyang (postcode : 24352)
 Gampong Blang Pulo (postcode : 24352)
 Gampong Cot Trieng (postcode : 24352)
 Gampong Meunasah Dayah (postcode : 24352)
 Gampong Meuria Paloh (postcode : 24352)
 Gampong Padang Sakti (postcode : 24352)
 Gampong Paloh Punti (postcode : 24352)
 Gampong Ujong Pacu (postcode : 24352)

References 

Lhokseumawe
Populated places in Aceh
districts of Lhokseumawe